Eugene William Carr (born September 17, 1951) is a Canadian former professional ice hockey forward who played 465 games in the National Hockey League (NHL). He played for the St. Louis Blues, New York Rangers, Los Angeles Kings, Pittsburgh Penguins and Atlanta Flames.

Born in Nanaimo, British Columbia, Carr's father, Red Carr, also played in the NHL.

Career statistics

Regular season and playoffs

Awards
 WCHL All-Star Team – 1971

External links 

1951 births
Living people
Atlanta Flames players
Canadian ice hockey centres
Ice hockey people from British Columbia
Los Angeles Kings players
National Hockey League first-round draft picks
New York Rangers players
Pittsburgh Penguins players
Sportspeople from Nanaimo
St. Louis Blues draft picks
St. Louis Blues players